Farsia (also known as Al Farciya or El Farcya  ), is an isolated village within the Western Sahara.

Populated places in Western Sahara